Yuki Tanaka is a Japanese volleyball player.

Yu(u)ki Tanaka may also refer to:

 Yuuki Tanaka, Japanese tennis player
 Yuki Tanaka (historian), Japanese historian